O'Neill Dam is an earthfill dam on San Luis Creek,  west of Los Banos, California, United States, on the eastern slopes of the Pacific Coast Ranges of Merced County.

Background
A morning-glory type spillway lies at the left bank of the reservoir.

O'Neill Forebay reservoir

The O'Neill Forebay reservoir is fed by releases from the San Luis Dam as well as from the Delta–Mendota Canal. Water from the Delta–Mendota Canal is lifted a vertical distance of  into a channel running  into the forebay. Drainage area of the reservoir downstream of the San Luis Dam is only .

O'Neill Pumping-Generating Plant 
The O'Neill Pumping-Generating Plant produces .

See also

List of dams and reservoirs in California

Notes

References

External links 

Dams completed in 1967
Dams in California
Buildings and structures in Merced County, California
United States Bureau of Reclamation dams
Embankment dams
Dams in the San Joaquin River basin
Central Valley Project
Hydroelectric power plants in California